Grays Point may refer to:

Places
In the United States
Grays Point, Missouri, an unincorporated community in Lawrence County
Grays Point, Scott County, Missouri, a ghost town
Grays Point (Washington), a headland on the Columbia River estuary, Washington State

Elsewhere
Grays Point, New South Wales, a suburb of the city of Sydney, Australia